|}

The Testimonial Stakes is a Listed flat horse race in Ireland open to thoroughbreds aged three years or older. It is run at The Curragh over a distance of 6 furlongs (1,207 metres), and it is scheduled to take place each year in September.

Winners

See also
 Horse racing in Ireland
 List of Irish flat horse races

References
Racing Post:

Flat races in Ireland
Open sprint category horse races
Curragh Racecourse